Daniel Richard Green Jr. (born June 22, 1987) is an American professional basketball player for the Cleveland Cavaliers of the National Basketball Association (NBA). He played college basketball for the University of North Carolina (UNC), where he played in more games (145) and had more wins (123) than any Tar Heel before him. Green is also the only player in the history of the Atlantic Coast Conference (ACC) with at least 1,000 points, 500 rebounds, 250 assists, 150 three-pointers, 150 blocks and 150 steals.

In 2009, he won an NCAA championship his senior year and was subsequently drafted by the Cavaliers with the 46th overall pick in the 2009 NBA draft. During the 2013 NBA Finals, Green set an NBA record for most three-point field goals made in a Finals series (23). He then won an NBA championship with the San Antonio Spurs the following season, and became just the third player from UNC to win an NCAA championship and an NBA championship, the two others being James Worthy and Michael Jordan. In 2019, he won a second NBA championship in his only season with the Toronto Raptors and followed that up with a third championship in 2020 in his only season with the Los Angeles Lakers.

Known for his perimeter defense, Green has been a key contributor on both ends on the floor throughout his NBA career, having been selected to his first NBA All-Defensive Second Team in the 2016–17 season.

High school career
As a high school freshman, Green attended North Babylon High School in North Babylon, New York on Long Island and in addition to basketball, he played quarterback on the football team. From his sophomore year onwards, Green attended St. Mary's High School, a private school, in Manhasset, New York. He averaged 20 points, 10 rebounds, 4 assists and 4 blocks as a senior. Considered a four-star recruit by Rivals.com, Green was listed as the No. 8 shooting guard and the No. 31 player in the nation in 2005.

College career
Green came off the bench as the sixth man during his freshman year at UNC. He averaged 5.2 points and 2.8 rebounds in his sophomore season. After his second year at North Carolina, Green considered transferring, but would ultimately finish his college career there.

In Green's junior year, he averaged 11.5 points, 4.9 rebounds, 2.0 assists, 1.9 turnovers, 1.2 steals, 1.2 blocks in 22.3 minutes per game. He also improved his true shooting percentage (TS%) significantly, increasing his field goal percentage to 46.9% and his free throw percentage to 87.3%. He shot 37.3% from the three-point line.

Approaching his senior season, he declared himself eligible for the 2008 NBA Draft, but did not sign with an agent so that he had the option to return to school, which he decided to do on June 16. He was named team captain alongside Bobby Frasor and Tyler Hansbrough for the year, and started every game as the Tar Heels won their fifth national championship. Green averaged 13.1 points, 4.7 rebounds, 2.7 assists, 1.7 turnovers, 1.8 steals and 1.3 blocks in 27.4 minutes per game for the season, again improving his shooting percentages, averaging 47.1% and 41.8% from the field and three-point line respectively.
Green was selected to the All-ACC third team, and the ACC's All-Defensive Team. He ended his college career with 1,368 points for the Tar Heels, and held the school's all-time record for wins, with 123.

Professional career

Cleveland Cavaliers (2009–2010)

The Cleveland Cavaliers selected Green as the 46th overall pick of the 2009 NBA draft. After he played in 20 games in his rookie year with the Cavaliers, the team waived Green at the beginning of the next season.

San Antonio Spurs (2010)
Green was picked up by the San Antonio Spurs on November 17, 2010. The Spurs waived him six days later after he appeared in two games.

Reno Bighorns (2011) 
In January 2011, Green was acquired by the Reno Bighorns of the NBA Development League. He averaged 20 points, a team high, and 7.5 rebounds in 16 games with the Bighorns.

Return to San Antonio (2011) 
The Spurs signed Green again in March 2011, assigned him to the Austin Toros of the NBA Development League on April 2, and then recalled him on April 3.

Olimpija (2011) 
In August 2011, Green signed a one-year contract with KK Union Olimpija, which included an NBA-out clause option when the 2011 NBA lockout ended.

Third stint with Spurs (2011–2018)

2011–13: Playoff upsets 
Green returned to the Spurs after the lockout ended. Green had a breakout season, as he started 38 of his 66 games played, averaging 9.1 ppg. Green eventually became the starting shooting guard for the Spurs when Manu Ginóbili returned to being the sixth man in the rotation. Green finished ninth in the league in voting for the NBA Most Improved Player Award.

On July 11, 2012, Green re-signed with the Spurs for $12 million over three years. In his first game of the season, he scored 9 points and added 2 blocks in San Antonio's win over New Orleans. On November 1, 2012, he scored 13 points in a win over the Thunder. Then on November 3, Danny Green scored 21 points to help the Spurs beat the Utah Jazz in a 110–100 win. On November 13, 2012, he hit a game-winner against the Los Angeles Lakers, finishing the game with 11 points. On February 6, 2013, Green recorded career-highs of 28 points and 8 three-pointers made in a win over the Minnesota Timberwolves. He was one three-pointer shy of Chuck Person's record for most three-pointers made in a single game as a Spur.

In Game 2 of the 2013 NBA Finals, Green was perfect from the field, including 5–5 from the three-point line. However, the Spurs lost in a blowout to the Miami Heat, 103–84. In Game 3 of the NBA Finals, Green hit 7–9 from three-point range, including the one to set a Finals record for most three-pointers in a game by a team. He notched 27 total points in the Spurs' blowout 113–77 victory as the team took a 2–1 series lead in the process. On June 16 in Game 5, Green made six three-pointers for a total of 25 in the series to that point, breaking the record for an NBA Finals series previously held by Ray Allen, who made 22 in six games with the Boston Celtics in 2008. By the end of the series, Green had made 27 three-pointers, but the Spurs lost the series in seven games. The record was later broken by Stephen Curry in 2016.

2013–18: First championship and final years with Spurs 
On April 11, 2014, Green scored a career-high 33 points in a 112–104 win over the Phoenix Suns. On June 15, 2014, Green won his first NBA championship after the Spurs defeated the Miami Heat 4 games to 1 in the 2014 NBA Finals. In doing so, Green joined Michael Jordan and James Worthy as the third Tar Heel to win both the NCAA and NBA championship.

On December 19, 2014, Green scored a season-high 27 points in the 119–129 triple overtime loss to the Portland Trail Blazers. On April 12, 2015, Green recorded 3 three-pointers against the Phoenix Suns to set a franchise record for the most three-pointers in a season at 191.

On July 14, 2015, Green re-signed with the Spurs to a reported four-year, $45 million contract. On January 6, 2016, Green hit two three-pointers against the Utah Jazz, giving him 662 with San Antonio to surpass Bruce Bowen (661) for second in franchise history.

On November 9, 2016, Green made his season debut for San Antonio, scoring eight points against the Houston Rockets in his return from a strained left quadriceps. At the season's end, he was named to the NBA All-Defensive Second Team.

On December 28, 2017, against the New York Knicks, Green became the 127th player in league history to reach 900 career 3-pointers.

Toronto Raptors (2018–2019)
On July 18, 2018, Green and teammate Kawhi Leonard were traded to the Toronto Raptors in exchange for DeMar DeRozan, Jakob Pöltl and a protected 2019 first round draft pick. On November 10, 2018, in a 128–112 win over the New York Knicks, Green reached 1,000 3-pointers for his career. On December 14, he had 19 points and 11 rebounds while matching his season high with five 3-pointers in a 128–122 loss to the Portland Trail Blazers. On January 19, he had a season-high 24 points and set a franchise record for 3-pointers in a quarter with seven in the third, as the Raptors beat the Memphis Grizzlies 119–90. With 21 points in the third, he fell one shy of Kyle Lowry's franchise record for a quarter. Green also matched a career high with eight 3s for the game. On April 1, he scored a season-high 29 points in a 121–109 win over the Orlando Magic. Green helped the Raptors reach the 2019 NBA Finals, where they defeated the Golden State Warriors in six games, with Green earning his second NBA championship.

Los Angeles Lakers (2019–2020)
The Los Angeles Lakers signed Green to a two-year $30 million contract on July 6, 2019. He debuted for the Lakers on October 22, 2019, where he led the team with 28 points in 32 minutes on 10-of-14 field goal makes and 7-of-9 three-point makes in a 112–102 loss to the Los Angeles Clippers. His 28 points are the most points in a debut in franchise history, breaking Kareem Abdul-Jabbar's record of 27 points.

Green contributed to the Lakers finishing as the top seed in the Western Conference in a shortened season due to the COVID-19 pandemic that suspended the season for four months. The Lakers reached the 2020 NBA Finals, where they defeated the Miami Heat 4–2 to win the 2020 NBA championship. Green and teammate LeBron James became the third and fourth players in league history to win a championship with three different teams, joining John Salley and Robert Horry.

Philadelphia 76ers (2020–2022)
On November 18, 2020, Green, along with the draft rights to Jaden McDaniels, was traded to the Oklahoma City Thunder in exchange for Dennis Schröder. On December 8, Green, Terrance Ferguson and Vincent Poirier were traded to the Philadelphia 76ers for Al Horford, the draft rights of Théo Maledon and Vasilije Micić, and a 2025 first-round pick.

On August 7, 2021, Green re-signed with the 76ers on a two-year, $20 million contract. On May 12, 2022, during Game 6 of the 76ers' second-round series against the Miami Heat, Green suffered a left knee injury in a 99–90 loss, due to a collision with his teammate Joel Embiid. The next day, he was diagnosed with a torn anterior cruciate ligament (ACL) and lateral cruciate ligament (LCL) in his left knee.

Memphis Grizzlies (2022–2023)
During the 2022 NBA draft, Green, along with the draft rights to David Roddy, were traded to the Memphis Grizzlies in exchange for De'Anthony Melton. On February 1, 2023, Green made his Grizzlies debut, putting up three points in 10 minutes played in a 122–112 loss to the Portland Trail Blazers.

Return to Cleveland (2023–present)
On February 9, 2023, Green was traded to the Houston Rockets in a three-team trade involving the Los Angeles Clippers. He and the Rockets agreed to a contract buyout three days later, and he was subsequently waived.

On February 15, 2023, Green signed with the Cleveland Cavaliers. He made his Cavaliers debut the same day, scoring three points in a 118–112 loss to the Philadelphia 76ers.

Career statistics

NBA

Regular season

|-
| style="text-align:left;"|
| style="text-align:left;"|Cleveland
| 20 || 0 || 5.8 || .385 || .273 || .667 || .9 || .3 || .3 || .2 || 2.0
|-
| style="text-align:left;"|
| style="text-align:left;"|San Antonio
| 8 || 0 || 11.5 || .486 || .368 ||  || 1.9 || .3 || .3 || .1 || 5.1
|-
| style="text-align:left;"|
| style="text-align:left;"|San Antonio
| style="background:#cfecec;"| 66* || 38 || 23.1 || .442 || .436 || .790 || 3.5 || 1.3 || .9 || .7 || 9.1
|-
| style="text-align:left;"|
| style="text-align:left;"|San Antonio
| 80 || 80 || 27.5 || .448 || .429 || .848 || 3.1 || 1.8 || 1.2 || .7 || 10.5
|-
| style="text-align:left; background:#afe6ba;"|
| style="text-align:left;"|San Antonio
| 68 || 59 || 24.3 || .432 || .415 || .794 || 3.4 || 1.5 || 1.0 || .9 || 9.1
|-
| style="text-align:left;"|
| style="text-align:left;"|San Antonio
| 81 || 80 || 28.5 || .436 || .418 || .874 || 4.2 || 2.0 || 1.2 || 1.1 || 11.7
|-
| style="text-align:left;"|
| style="text-align:left;"|San Antonio
| 79 || 79 || 26.1 || .376 || .332 || .739 || 3.8 || 1.8 || 1.0 || .8 || 7.2 
|-
| style="text-align:left;"|
| style="text-align:left;"|San Antonio
| 68 || 68 || 26.6 || .392 || .379 || .844 || 3.3 || 1.8 || 1.0 || .9 || 7.3 
|-
| style="text-align:left;"|
| style="text-align:left;"|San Antonio
| 70 || 60 || 25.6 || .387 || .363 || .769 || 3.6 || 1.6 || .9 || 1.1 || 8.6 
|-
| style="text-align:left; background:#afe6ba;"|
| style="text-align:left;"|Toronto
| 80 || 80 || 27.7 || .465 || .455 || .841 || 4.0 || 1.6 || .9 || .7 || 10.3
|-
| style="text-align:left; background:#afe6ba;"|
| style="text-align:left;"|L.A. Lakers
| 68 || 68 || 24.8 || .416 || .367 || .688 || 3.3 || 1.3 || 1.3 || .5 || 8.0
|-
| style="text-align:left;"|
| style="text-align:left;"|Philadelphia
| 69 || 69 || 28.0 || .412 || .405 || .775 || 3.8 || 1.7 || 1.3 || .8 || 9.5
|-
| style="text-align:left;"|
| style="text-align:left;"|Philadelphia
| 62 || 28 || 21.8 || .394 || .380 || .786 || 2.5 || 1.0 || 1.0 || .6 || 5.9
|-
| style="text-align:left;"|
| style="text-align:left;"|Memphis
| 3 || 0 || 14.3 || .273 || .375 ||  || 1.3 || .7 || .3 || .0 || 3.0
|- class="sortbottom"
| style="text-align:center;" colspan="2"|Career
| 822 || 709 || 25.3 || .421 || .399 || .804 || 3.4 || 1.5 || 1.0 || .8 || 8.7

Playoffs

|-
| style="text-align:left;"|2011
| style="text-align:left;"|San Antonio
| 4 || 0 || 1.8 || .333 || .250 ||  || .3 || .5 || .3 || .3 || 1.3
|-
| style="text-align:left;"|2012
| style="text-align:left;"|San Antonio
| 14 || 12 || 20.6 || .418 || .345 || .700 || 3.2 || 1.1 || .5 || .7 || 7.4
|-
| style="text-align:left;"|2013
| style="text-align:left;"|San Antonio
| 21 || 21 || 31.9 || .446 || .482 || .800 || 4.1 || 1.5 || 1.0 || 1.1 || 11.1
|-
| style="text-align:left; background:#afe6ba;"|2014
| style="text-align:left;"|San Antonio
| style="background:#cfecec;"| 23* || style="background:#cfecec;"| 23* || 23.0 || .491 || .475 || .818 || 3.0 || .9 || 1.4 || .7 || 9.3
|-
| style="text-align:left;"|2015
| style="text-align:left;"|San Antonio
| 7 || 7 || 29.1 || .344 || .300 || .667 || 3.1 || 2.1 || 1.0 || 1.0 || 8.3
|-
| style="text-align:left;"|2016
| style="text-align:left;"|San Antonio
| 10 || 10 || 26.7 || .462 || .500 || .667 || 3.1 || .7 || 2.1 || .8 || 8.6
|-
| style="text-align:left;"|2017
| style="text-align:left;"|San Antonio
| 16 || 16 || 27.2 || .405 || .342 || .571 || 3.6 || 1.4 || .6 || .9 || 7.8
|-
| style="text-align:left;"|2018
| style="text-align:left;"|San Antonio
| 5 || 5 || 20.6 || .267 || .250 ||  || 2.2 || .2 || .2 || .8 || 4.2
|-
| style="text-align:left; background:#afe6ba;"|2019
| style="text-align:left;"|Toronto
| style="background:#cfecec;"| 24* || style="background:#cfecec;"| 24* || 28.5 || .342 || .328 || .913 || 3.6 || 1.1 || 1.3 || .5 || 6.9
|-
| style="text-align:left; background:#afe6ba;"|2020
| style="text-align:left;"|L.A. Lakers
| style="background:#cfecec;"| 21* || style="background:#cfecec;"| 21* || 25.0 || .347 || .339 || .667 || 3.1 || 1.2 || 1.0 || .8 || 8.0
|-
| style="text-align:left;"|2021
| style="text-align:left;"|Philadelphia
| 8 || 8 || 24.9 || .438 || .378 || — || 2.6 || 2.6 || 1.1 || 1.0 || 7.0
|-
| style="text-align:left;"|2022
| style="text-align:left;"|Philadelphia
| 12 || 12 || 26.6 || .404 || .408 || .000 || 3.1 || .8 || 1.0 || .3 || 8.6
|- class="sortbottom"
| style="text-align:center;" colspan="2"|Career
| 165 || 159 || 25.6 || .405 || .389 || .745 || 3.2 || 1.2 || 1.1 || .8 || 8.1

College

|-
| style="text-align:left;"|2005–06
| style="text-align:left;"|North Carolina
| 31 || 0 || 15.3 || .433 || .355 || .792 || 3.7 || 1.1 || .7 || 1.0 || 7.5
|-
| style="text-align:left;"|2006–07
| style="text-align:left;"|North Carolina
| 37 || 0 || 13.6 || .411 || .296 || .848 || 2.8 || 1.1 || .6 || .7 || 5.2
|-
| style="text-align:left;"|2007–08
| style="text-align:left;"|North Carolina
| 39 || 1 || 22.3 || .469 || .373 || .873 || 4.9 || 2.0 || 1.2 || 1.2 || 11.5
|-
| style="text-align:left;"|2008–09
| style="text-align:left;"|North Carolina
| 38 || 38 || 27.4 || .471 || .418 || .852 || 4.7 || 2.7 || 1.8 || 1.3 || 13.1
|- class="sortbottom"
| style="text-align:center;" colspan="2"|Career
| 145 || 39 || 19.9 || .455 || .375 || .845 || 4.1 || 1.8 || 1.1 || 1.1 || 9.4

Personal life

Family
Green's brother, Rashad, played for Manhattan College in 2007–08 and the University of San Francisco from 2009 to 2012. His younger brother, Devonte Green, played for Indiana University. His second cousins are professional players Gerald Green and Garlon Green. A first cousin, Jordan Green, played for Texas A&M University. A third cousin, Willie Green, played for the University of Detroit Mercy and then in the NBA, He is now the head coach of New Orleans Pelicans.

In 2020, Green got engaged to his longtime girlfriend.  The two were married in 2021.

Podcast
In 2018, Green and longtime friend and sports broadcaster Harrison Sanford launched a podcast entitled "Inside the Green Room". While they intended to start with a soft launch in the summer of 2018, Green was traded to the Toronto Raptors just prior to recording what was to be the pilot episode, so they decided to do a full launch with the first episode. The podcast gained sponsorship from Yahoo Sports Canada. Episodes have featured players and coaches from the Toronto Raptors, as well as players from other teams and other sports journalists. Green has expressed an interest in moving into sports broadcasting after his playing career is over.

See also

 List of National Basketball Association career 3-point scoring leaders
 List of National Basketball Association career playoff 3-point scoring leaders

References

External links

 North Carolina Tar Heels bio
 Scout.com profile
 ESPN.com profile

1987 births
Living people
21st-century African-American sportspeople
African-American basketball players
American expatriate basketball people in Canada
American expatriate basketball people in Slovenia
American men's basketball players
American podcasters
Austin Toros players
Basketball players from New York (state)
Cleveland Cavaliers draft picks
Cleveland Cavaliers players
Erie BayHawks (2008–2017) players
KK Olimpija players
Los Angeles Lakers players
McDonald's High School All-Americans
Memphis Grizzlies players
North Carolina Tar Heels men's basketball players
Parade High School All-Americans (boys' basketball)
People from Manhasset, New York
People from North Babylon, New York
Philadelphia 76ers players
Reno Bighorns players
San Antonio Spurs players
Shooting guards
Small forwards
Sportspeople from Suffolk County, New York
Toronto Raptors players